Little Heart's Ease may refer to:

 Little Heart's Ease, Newfoundland and Labrador
 Little Heart's Ease (album), by Royal City